Pearse Cahill (1917 – 7 December 2011) was an Irish aviation pioneer from Skerries, County Dublin, Ireland. His father started Iona National Airways in 1930 and Pearse operated the airline for many years.

Family
Cahill was married to Constance and had three children – Enda, Hugh and Peter.

Aviation
In 1933, Cahill made his first solo flight at Kildonan.

References

1917 births
2011 deaths
Irish aviators